Cry for You – The Album is the debut studio album by Swedish singer September in the United Kingdom. The album was released on 2 August 2009, as a digital download by Hard2Beat Records. The album includes new material, along with new versions of other songs from previous albums, including a new edit of "Satellites", due to it not being originally released in the UK by Hard2Beat and on a different label. Cry for You features her singles that were released in the UK; "Satellites", "Cry for You", "Can't Get Over" and "Until I Die". Despite "Cry for You" peaking at five on the UK Singles Chart, the album failed to chart on the UK Albums Chart.

Track listing
"Cry for You" (UK Radio Edit) Original Version was from the album In Orbit 2:46
"Can't Get Over" (UK Radio Edit) Original Version was from the album Dancing Shoes 3:10
"Until I Die" (UK Radio Edit) Original Version was from the album Dancing Shoes 3:13
"Sin of My Own" New Song (Petra Marklund / Gustav Efraimsson / Bjorn Edman) 3:04
"Satellites" (Hard2Beat Edit) Original Version was from the album In Orbit 3:15
"We Can Do It" (UK Radio Edit) Original Version was from the debut album September 3:33
"Flowers on the Grave" From the album In Orbit 4:18
"Leave It All Behind" (UK Radio Edit) New Song 2:42
"Looking for Love" From the album In Orbit 3:23
"September All Over" (UK Radio Edit) Original Version was from the debut album September 3:34
"Because I Love You" (Dave Ramone Edit) Original Version was from the album Dancing Shoes 2:46
"Midnight Heartache" From the album In Orbit 3:45
"Sacrifice" From the album In Orbit 3:56
"End of the Rainbow" From the album In Orbit 3:39
"Cry For You" (Original Edit) From the album Dancing Shoes  2:46
"Can't Get Over" (Original Edit) From the album Dancing Shoes 3:00
"Until I Die" (Original Edit) From the album Dancing Shoes 3:42

References

Petra Marklund albums
2009 albums
Dance Nation (record label) albums